William Harrison Pearson (18 January 1922 – 27 September 2002) was a New Zealand fiction writer, essayist and critic.

Early life 
Born in Greymouth Pearson began writing at an early age, writing for the children's page of the Christchurch Star-Sun. He completed a B.A. in English at the Canterbury University College in 1939 and trained as a teacher at Dunedin Training College. He taught briefly at Blackball Primary School in 1942. He served in World War II between 1942 and 1946 firstly in the dental corps in Fiji, then in the infantry in Egypt, Italy and Japan.

Career 
Pearson completed his M.A. at Canterbury University and edited the student newspaper Canta in 1948. He taught briefly at Oxford District High School before travelling to London in 1949 to begin a PhD at the University of London which he completed in 1952. He returned to New Zealand in 1954 to teach in the English Department at the Auckland University College until his retirement in 1986. He spent time as a research fellow in the Research School of Pacific Studies at the Australian National University in Canberra from 1967 to 1969.

His collected essays and reviews on New Zealand literature and society were published in Fretful Sleepers and Other Essays in 1974. The essay Fretful Sleepers, first published in Landfall in 1952, was written while living in England when he was contemplating returning to New Zealand. It was based on his own thoughts of New Zealand and his time in the forces and was an analysis and description of New Zealand as well as a plea for more variety, tolerance and sensitivity.

He drew on his experiences of teaching at Blackball to write a novel entitled Coal Flat which was published in 1963. It was begun after he finished his PhD and completed before he left England. During the two years of writing it he supported himself by doing supply teaching (replacing teachers who are absent).

A well-reviewed biography, entitled No Fretful Sleeper: A Life of Bill Pearson by Paul Millar, was published in 2010. The cover of the book is an oil painting of Pearson painted by Herry Perry in 1952.

After the publication of Coal Flat Pearson wrote no more fiction but concentrated on essays, editing and literary criticism.

Personal life 
Pearson had a close relationship with the Māori university community during his tenure at the University of Auckland. He was involved in the creation of the Māori Studies department at the university.

Pearson was a closeted gay man for much of his life; he was trapped between a sexual identity that  through much of his life time was the object of extreme prejudice and some criminal sanction, and his desire to fit in with his peers. His fear of being outed drove him underground. Homosexual relations between men were only decriminalized in New Zealand in 1986.

He was also a social activist and pacifist during the 1950s and 1960s. He was a member of the New Zealand Peace Council and edited their magazine Peace.  He belonged to CND, the Council for Racial Equality (CARE) and the Auckland Council of Civil Liberties, and edited Here and Now magazine.

Works
 Attitudes to the Maori in some Pakeha fiction (1958)
 Coal Flat (1963), full text at the NZETC
Collected stories, 1935–1963 /  by Frank Sargeson; with an introduction by Bill Pearson (1964)
 Henry Lawson among Maoris (1968)
 Brown man's burden, and later stories / by Roderick Finlayson; edited and introduced by Bill Pearson (1973)
 Fretful Sleepers and Other Essays (1974), full text at the NZETC
 Rifled sanctuaries : some views of the Pacific Islands in western literature to 1900 (1984)
 Six stories (1991)

References

Further reading 

 "Obituary". Dominion Post. 3 October 2002. B6

External links
 Pearson, Bill at Read NZ
 Paul Millar. No fretful sleeper Auckland University Press Archived at Wayback Machine
 Portrait of Bill Pearson by Heather Perry (1952), in Alexander Turnbull Library

New Zealand male novelists
New Zealand essayists
New Zealand literary critics
New Zealand LGBT novelists
People from Greymouth
Academic staff of the University of Auckland
1922 births
2002 deaths
University of Canterbury alumni
Alumni of University College London
20th-century New Zealand novelists
New Zealand gay writers
Male essayists
People educated at Greymouth High School
20th-century essayists
20th-century New Zealand male writers
New Zealand military personnel of World War II
New Zealand expatriates in Fiji
Expatriates in Egypt
New Zealand expatriates in Italy
New Zealand expatriates in Japan
20th-century New Zealand LGBT people
Gay novelists